Strabena eros is a butterfly in the family Nymphalidae. It is found in central Madagascar. The habitat consists of forests.

References

Strabena
Butterflies described in 1971
Endemic fauna of Madagascar
Butterflies of Africa